David Archibald may refer to:

David Archibald (footballer) (1902–?), Scottish footballer
David Archibald (politician) (1717–1795), Irish-born farmer and politician
Dave Archibald (David J. Archibald, born 1969), Canadian ice hockey player